Linda Whetstone (17 November 1942 – 15 December 2021) was a British libertarian and free market campaigner, and also a significant figure in British equestrian sport.

Whetstone was born in Binfield, Berkshire on 17 November 1942. Her father was Antony Fisher, founder of the Institute of Economic Affairs. She gained a degree by correspondence in Economics from the University of London.

She was the first Chairman of the British Equestrian Federation council, and was Chairman of British Dressage from 2018. Other positions she held included Chairman of Atlas Network from 2016, President of the Mont Pelerin Society in 2020, Chairman of the Board of Free Social Networks from 2000, and Chairman of the International Policy Network. She was also on the boards of the Institute of Economic Affairs and the Islam and Liberty Network.

Linda Whetstone was a respected member of the Libertarian community, and following her passing, several organizations dedicated projects to honor her legacy. For instance, the Georgian libertarian organization, Franklin Club, established the Linda Whetstone Tbilisi Policy Network, a policy initiative that seeks to bring together students and professionals in the pursuit of policy changes that promote greater freedom.

With Nouh El Harmouzi she co-edited the book "Islamic Foundations of a Free Society", which was published in Dari, Indonesian, Arabic, French and Persian. She also produced a CD containing works by libertarian thinkers, over 150,000 copies of which were distributed in more than 60 countries.

She was married to Francis Whetstone, a Lloyd's underwriter, and they had three children, including public relations executive Rachel Whetstone. Linda Whetstone died suddenly whilst attending a Liberty Forum in Miami, Florida, on 15 December 2021, at the age of 79.

Books

Articles

References

1942 births
2021 deaths
British libertarians
British female equestrians
People from Binfield